Atlanta Dragway was a drag racing facility located in Banks County, Georgia, just north of Commerce, Georgia.  From 1981 until its closure after the 2021 season, it hosted the NHRA Camping World Drag Racing Series, Southern Nationals.

History
Atlanta Dragway was built in 1975 by Gene Bennett and originally had been graded out for an airport. The original airport tower served as the original timing tower, and the track direction was the same as the airport without asphalt, just Georgia red clay. In 1980, the track was sold to Norman Pearah and became an NHRA-sanctioned track. Back then, the track was only opened twice a year for major events.

The track was purchased in 1987 by Pro Stock driver Gary Brown and partners J.D. Stevens and Rudy Bowen. The track underwent major reconstruction to put in new aluminum grandstand seating, permanent restrooms and rebuilt concession buildings. In 1989, the thirteen-year-old track was resurfaced with a concrete launching pad and a new timing system. In addition to the track modification, a reconditioned VIP tower complete with a timing deck, press center and corporate suites was built in 1990.

NHRA purchased the track in 1993. They resurfaced the track and added an updated timing system in 1999.  The tower restrooms were remodeled and all concession, tower and ticket buildings were rewired. In 2003, the track's FM radio and public address system were both upgraded. In 2008 NHRA history was made at the track when Ashley Force Hood became the first female driver to win a Funny Car event. NHRA has announced intentions to sell the property after the 2021 meet.

NHRA announced that the "2021 NHRA Southern Nationals would be the final major NHRA national event to be held at historic Atlanta Dragway in Commerce, GA."

Winners

Top Fuel

Funny Car

Pro Stock

References

External links

Buildings and structures in Banks County, Georgia
NHRA Division 2 drag racing venues
Motorsport venues in Georgia (U.S. state)
Tourist attractions in Banks County, Georgia
1975 establishments in Georgia (U.S. state)
Sports venues completed in 1975
Motorsport venues in the United States
Drag racing venues
Sports venues in Georgia (U.S. state)